Northern Wisconsin International Airport may refer to:

 Appleton International Airport, an airport in Greenville, Wisconsin
 Green Bay–Austin Straubel International Airport, an airport in Ashwaubenon, Wisconsin